Roger Milliot (26 June 1943 – 28 February 2010) was a French racing cyclist. He rode in the 1966 Tour de France.

References

1943 births
2010 deaths
French male cyclists
Place of birth missing